Sir Graham Morgan (born 20 August 1947) is a British healthcare professional and healthcare director.

Early life and family
Morgan was born on 20 August 1947 to Islwyn and Phyllis Morgan. He was educated at Treorchy Secondary Modern School in Treorchy, Wales.

In 2006, Morgan entered into a civil partnership with Raymond Willetts.

Career
Morgan trained as nurse at Llandough Hospital, Cardiff, becoming a registered general nurse in 1969. He worked at Llandough Hospital as a staff nurse for a year, before spells at Royal Marsden Hospital and St Mary's Hospital, London. Between 1974 and 1983, he was the Nursing Officer at King's College Hospital, and was then Assistant Director of Nursing at St Charles' Hospital until 1991. He was the Special Nurse Adviser (1991–94) and then Director of Nursing and Quality (1994–99) at the Central Middlesex Hospital. Between 1999 and 2005, he was Executive Director of Nursing at the North West London Hospitals NHS Trust. After two years as Director of Clinical Strategy at the same Trust, he worked as an independent health care adviser between 2007 and 2017.

In the 2000 Birthday Honours, Morgan was appointed a Knight Bachelor (Kt) "for services to Health Care". On 21 November 2000, he was knighted by Queen Elizabeth II during a ceremony at Buckingham Palace.

Ordained ministry
Morgan was ordained in the Church of England as a deacon in 1983 and as a priest in 1984.  He has been a non-stipendiary minister (formally Honorary Associate Priest) at St Michael and All Angels Church, Bedford Park, since 2003.

References

1947 births
Knights Bachelor
Welsh nurses
Living people
British nursing administrators
People educated at Treorchy Comprehensive School
Male nurses
LGBT Anglican clergy
20th-century Church of England clergy
21st-century Church of England clergy
Welsh Anglican priests